In England and Wales, the imprisonment for public protection (IPP) sentence was a form of indeterminate sentence introduced by section 225 of the Criminal Justice Act 2003 (with effect from 2005) by the Home Secretary, David Blunkett, and abolished in 2012. It was intended to protect the public against criminals whose crimes were not serious enough to merit a normal life sentence but who were regarded as too dangerous to be released when the term of their original sentence had expired. It is composed of a punitive "tariff" intended to be proportionate to the gravity of the crime committed, and an indeterminate period which commences after the expiration of the tariff and lasts until the Parole Board judges the prisoner no longer poses a risk to the public and is fit to be released. The equivalent for under-18s was called detention for public protection, introduced by s. 226 of the 2003 Act. The sentences came into effect on 4 April 2005.

Although there is no limit to how long prisoners can be detained under IPPs, and some may never be released, they may be released on review; an IPP sentence is not a sentence of life imprisonment with a whole-life tariff.

In 2007, the Queen's Bench Division of the High Court ruled that the continued incarceration of prisoners serving IPPs after tariff expiry where the prisons lack the facilities and courses required to assess their suitability for release was unlawful, bringing up concern that many dangerous offenders would be freed. In 2010 a joint report by the chief inspectors of prisons and probation concluded that IPP sentences were unsustainable with UK prison overcrowding.

In 2012, the IPP sentence for new cases was abolished by the Legal Aid, Sentencing and Punishment of Offenders Act, although over 6,000 prison inmates remained imprisoned for public protection; over 4,600 remained as of June 2015, and over 3,000 remained as of 2017. Three-quarters of them had completed their minimum term, and hundreds had served five times the minimum. The government's policy was that IPP prisoners should remain in prison until it is deemed that the risks they pose if released are manageable. Some of the alleged victims of John Worboys whose cases were not taken up by the Crown Prosecution Service were assured that the IPP sentence in effect meant a life sentence.

See also
Involuntary commitment
Incapacitation (penology)

References

External links
Chapter 5 of Part 12 of the Criminal Justice Act 2003, as amended

Penal system in the United Kingdom